The Taoyuan City Government (TYCG) is the municipal government of Taoyuan, Taiwan.

History
Originally established as Taoyuan County, the county was upgraded to Taoyuan City on 25 December 2014.

Organization

 Department of Civil Affairs
 Department of Social Welfare
 Department of General Affairs
 Department of Legal Affairs
 Department of Transportation
 Fire Department
 Department of Public Works
 Department of Indigenous Affairs
 Department of Labor
 Department of Public Health
 Department of Education
 Department of Water Resources
 Department of Agriculture
 Department of Tourism
 Research and Evaluation Commission
 Department of Finance
 Department of Land Administration
 Department of Personnel
 Department of Governmental Ethics
 Department of Urban Development
 Department of Environmental Protection
 Police Department
 Department of Cultural Affairs
 Department of Economic Development
 Department of Hakka Affairs
 Department of Taxation
 Department of Public Information
 Department of Budget, Accounting and Statistics

Access
Taoyuan City Hall is accessible within walking distance north west from Taoyuan Station of Taiwan Railways.

See also
 Taoyuan City Council

References

External link
 

 
Local governments of the Republic of China
Taoyuan District